Woodlawn, also known as the Trible House, is a historic home located near Miller's Tavern, Essex County, Virginia. It was built about 1816–1820, and is a -story, two bay, frame dwelling with a gambrel roof.  It features two exterior end chimneys constructed of brick.  A lean-to addition was built about 1840.

It was listed on the National Register of Historic Places in 1980.

References

External links
 Woodlawn, U.S. Route 360, Pauls Crossroads, Essex County, VA at the Historic American Buildings Survey (HABS)

Houses on the National Register of Historic Places in Virginia
Houses completed in 1820
Houses in Essex County, Virginia
National Register of Historic Places in Essex County, Virginia
Historic American Buildings Survey in Virginia